Union Femenina de Colombia (UFC), was a Colombian women's rights organization, founded in 1944. Alongside the Alianza Femenina, it was one of the two big women's organizations campaigning for women's suffrage in Colombia. 

The Colombian women's movement had begun in the 1930s. In 1932, married women were granted the right to own property and the right to university education. In 1944, a female lawyer were denied the right to become a judge. This caused the formation of the UFC. The UFC worked for the improvement of women's rights. The members of the UFC mostly consisted of educated middle class and upper class women. Many of the were related or affiliated with male member of the Liberal Party, who supported women's suffrage. The UFC published the women's magazine Agitacion Femenina, edited by Ofelia Uribe, and the radio show Sutilezas. It was also supported by the biggest women's magazine in Colombia, the Letras y Encajes, which was conservative but did support women's suffrage. 

Women's suffrage was introduced in Colombia in 1954.

References

 Susan Franceschet, Mona Lena Krook, Netina Tan:  The Palgrave Handbook of Women’s Political Rights

1940s establishments in Colombia
Feminism and history
Feminist organizations in South America
Organizations established in 1944
Social history of Colombia
Voter rights and suffrage organizations
Women's suffrage in Colombia
Feminism in Colombia